WMVA was an oldies formatted broadcast radio station licensed to Martinsville, Virginia, serving Martinsville and Henry County, Virginia.  WMVA was last owned and operated by Martinsville Media, Inc.

History
In October 2005, William D. Wyatt, Jr. purchased WMVA, which had an adult contemporary and sports radio format, from Billy D. Wilson and Linda R. Wilson. whom purchased it from founder Hans Peter Blume 

The station went silent on January 28, 2019, and it never returned to the air. Its license was surrendered on July 23, 2021 and was cancelled on July 27, 2021.

Past personalities
 Charles F. Adams, newscaster (1942-1947, 1948, 1955)

 Pete Bluhm

References

External links
FCC Station Search Details: DWMVA (Facility ID: 40510)
FCC History Cards for WMVA (covering 1938-1981)

MVA
Radio stations established in 1941
Radio stations disestablished in 2019
Defunct radio stations in the United States
MVA